The 19th People's Choice Awards, honoring the best in popular culture for 1992, were held on March 9, 1993, at Universal Studios Hollywood, in Universal City, California. They were hosted by John Ritter and Jane Seymour, and broadcast on CBS.

Special tributes were paid to both Knots Landing and Cheers for their long runs on television.

Awards
Winners are listed first, in bold.

References

External links
1993 People's Choice.com

People's Choice Awards
1993 awards in the United States
1993 in California
March 1993 events in the United States